Niklas Lundström (born 10 January 1993) is a Swedish professional ice hockey goaltender currently playing for AIK in the HockeyAllsvenskan (Allsv). Lundström made his professional debut in Sweden with AIK men's elite team of the Swedish Hockey League (SHL). Lundström has also played in Sweden's national junior ice hockey team, both the under-16 and under-17 respective teams.

Playing career
Lundström played his first Elitserien game on 28 December 2010, which was against HV71. He replaced Björn Bjurling in the net after Bjurling had allowed three goals in the game's first 13 minutes. However, AIK lost the game 8–2.

Lundström was drafted by the St. Louis Blues in the 5th round of the 2011 NHL Entry Draft as the 132nd pick overall.

In the midst of his second season within the Blues organization in 2015–16, Lundström was traded by St. Louis along with a 5th round selection in 2016 to the Edmonton Oilers in exchange for Anders Nilsson on 27 February 2016.

Unable to establish a career in North America, Lundström returned to Sweden as a free agent and signed a one-year deal with second tier club, IF Björklöven of the HockeyAllsvenskan on April 29, 2016.

References

External links

1993 births
Living people
AIK IF players
Alaska Aces (ECHL) players
Bakersfield Condors players
IF Björklöven players
Chicago Wolves players
HC Dukla Jihlava players
Elmira Jackals (ECHL) players
Graz 99ers players
Huddinge IK players
Linköping HC players
IK Oskarshamn players
Norfolk Admirals (ECHL) players
St. Louis Blues draft picks
Södertälje SK players
Swedish ice hockey goaltenders
Swedish expatriate ice hockey players in the United States
Swedish expatriate sportspeople in the Czech Republic
Swedish expatriate ice hockey players in Denmark
Swedish expatriate sportspeople in Austria
Expatriate ice hockey players in the Czech Republic
Expatriate ice hockey players in Austria